The 1988 Puerto Rican general elections were held in Puerto Rico on 8 November 1988. Rafael Hernández Colón of the Popular Democratic Party (PPD) was re-elected Governor, whilst the PPD also won a majority of seats in the House of Representatives and the Senate. Voter turnout was 84.5%.

Results

Governor

Resident Commissioner

House of Representatives

Senate

References

1988 elections in the Caribbean
1988
Elections
Puerto Rico